The 1993 British National Track Championships were a series of track cycling competitions held from 24–31 July 1993 at the Leicester Velodrome. The Championships were organised by the British Cycling Federation and for the first time in its history became 'Open', meaning professional and amateur cyclists competed in the same event.

Medal summary

Men's Events

Women's Events

References

National Track Championships
National Track Championships